The canton of Périgord Vert Nontronnais is an administrative division of the Dordogne department, southwestern France. It was created at the French canton reorganisation which came into effect in March 2015. Its seat is in Nontron.

It consists of the following communes:

Abjat-sur-Bandiat
Augignac
Le Bourdeix
Busserolles
Bussière-Badil
Champniers-et-Reilhac
Champs-Romain
Connezac
Étouars
Hautefaye
Javerlhac-et-la-Chapelle-Saint-Robert
Lussas-et-Nontronneau
Milhac-de-Nontron
Nontron
Piégut-Pluviers
Saint-Barthélemy-de-Bussière
Saint-Estèphe
Saint-Front-la-Rivière
Saint-Front-sur-Nizonne
Saint-Martial-de-Valette
Saint-Martin-le-Pin
Saint-Pardoux-la-Rivière
Saint-Saud-Lacoussière
Savignac-de-Nontron
Sceau-Saint-Angel
Soudat
Teyjat
Varaignes

References

Cantons of Dordogne